The Karachi Kings is a franchise cricket team that represents Karachi in the Pakistan Super League since 2016 and is one of the expensive teams in League's history. They were one of the six teams that competed in the 2020 season.  In the final, they beat Lahore Qalandars by 5 wickets, to win their maiden PSL title.

The team was captained by Imad Wasim, coached by Dean Jones,  until his sudden death in September 2020. Babar Azam was the team's leading run-scorer while, Mohammad Amir was leading wicket-taker.

The team won five of its ten fixtures with one being washed out, therefore, qualified for the play-offs.

Impact of COVID-19

The playoff stage of the tournament was postponed due to the COVID-19 pandemic. On 2 July 2020, PCB announced that they are looking forward to complete the season in November 2020. On 2 September 2020, the PCB confirmed the fixtures for the remaining matches. The matches are scheduled to be held at Gaddafi Stadium in Lahore, in the month of November on 14 and 15, with the final scheduled to be played on 17.

Squad

 Players with international caps are listed in bold.
Ages are given as of the first day of the season, 20 February 2020

Season standings

References

2020 in Sindh
2020 Pakistan Super League 
2020